Centro Regional de Estudios Económicos de Bahía Blanca, Argentina (CREEBBA) is a non-governmental, non profit, independent organization grouping a team of reputed researchers on economical and financial aspects of the city, the region and the Nation.

Origin and initial sponsors

The Chamber of Commerce of Bahía Blanca and Fundación de Investigaciones Económicas Latinoamericanas (FIEL) were their initial supporters leading their independent organization to achieve their main aim, which is providing neutral information on economy that can be useful in the decision making processes of commerce and industrial enterprises of the city and region.

General information

Self supported by subscriptions of entreprises and industries of the region, grants from The Chamber of Commerce of Bahía Blanca and -sometimes- from the Ministry of Economy of the Nation, they publish bimonthly financial reports on indexes of prices, cost of living, industrial production, macroeconomy of the Nation, Industrial Index of each month and many different other useful data for those directly or indirectly related to producing and manufacturing goods and services.

They also provide free online access to archives of data on economy and finances, local and national financial indexes.

See also
Buenos Aires Stock Exchange
MERVAL

References

  CREEBA, Centro Regional de Estudios Económicos de Bahía Blanca, Argentina
  Chamber of Commerce of Bahía Blanca
Buenos Aires Stock Exchange Home Page (Spanish, English available but language choice is set by a cookie)
MERVAL official page
Burcap

Organizations established in 1854
Stock Exchange
1854 establishments in Argentina